The Custer County Courthouse in Custer, South Dakota is a courthouse built in 1881.  It was listed on the National Register of Historic Places in 1972.

It is a three-story red brick building "reflecting a plains adaptation of the Italian style.

A new courthouse was scheduled to be completed in 1993.

References

	
Courthouses on the National Register of Historic Places in South Dakota
Italianate architecture in South Dakota
Government buildings completed in 1881
Custer County, South Dakota